Ploimida is an order of rotifers belonging to the class Monogononta.

Families:
 Colurellidae Wesenberg-Lund, 1929 accepted as Lepadellidae Harring, 1913
 Lepadellidae

References

Monogononta